A list of the most notable films produced in the Cinema of Greece ordered split by year and decade of release on separate pages. For an alphabetical list of articles on Greek films see :Category:Greek films.

Pre-1940 

Golfo, 1914
Maria i Pentagiotissa / *[[Μαρία η Πενταγιώτισσα, 1928

Οι Απάχηδες των Αθηνών (1930) τoυ Δημήτρη Γαζιάδη

Agapitikos tis voskopoulas /Ο Αγαπητικός της βοσκοπούλας, 1932

1940s

1950s

O methystakas / Ο μεθύστακας (The Drunkard), George Tzavellas, 1950
Kyriakatiko xypnima / Κυριακάτικο Ξύπνημα (Windfall in Athens), Michael Cacoyannis, 1954
To pontikaki / Το Ποντικάκι (The little mouse), Nikos Tsiforos, 1954
Ι Kalpiki lira / Η Κάλπικη λίρα   (The Counterfeit Coin), George Tzavellas, 1955
Stella / Στέλλα, Michael Cacoyannis, 1955
Μαγική Πόλις / Magiki Polis (Magic City), 1955
Η Αρπαγή της Περσεφόνης / I Arpagi tis Persefonis, 1956
A Girl in Black / Το Κορίτσι με τα Μαύρα, Michael Cacoyannis, 1956
Ο Δράκος / O Drakos, 1956
Μαζί σου για πάντα / Mazi sou gia Panta (Beside You Forever), 1956
Πρωτευουσιάνικες περιπέτειες / Protevousianikes Peripeteies, 1956
To koritsi me ta paramythia / Το κορίτσι με τα παραμύθια, 1956
Maria Pentagiotissa / Μαρία  Πενταγιώτισσα, 1957
 Θέμα Τιμής / To Telefteo psemma (A Matter of Dignity), Michael Cacoyannis, 1957
Έχει Θείο το Κορίτσι/Echei Theio to Koritsi, 1957
Ο Γυναικάς/O Gynaikas (The Lady), 1957
Ο Μεγαλοκαρχαρίας/O Megalokarcharias, 1957
Erotas stous ammolofous  / Έρωτας στους αμμόλοφους = Love in the dunes, 1958
O Mimikos kai i Mairi / Ο Μιμίκος και η Μαίρη, 1958
Charoumeni Alites / Χαρούμενοι Αλήτες, 1958
Diakopes stin Aegina / Διακοπές στην Αίγινα, 1958
Mia laterna, Mia Zoi / Μια λατέρνα, Μια Ζωή (Sokrates Kapsaskis), 1958
O Leftas / Ο Λεφτάς, 1958
O Misogynis / Ο Μισογύνης, 1958
We Have Only One Life / Μια ζωή την έχουμε (Mia Zoi tin Échome), 1958
Astero / Αστέρω, 1959
Dada me to zori / Νταντά με το ζόρι, 1959
I Liza to' skase / Η Λίζα το’σκασε ([Lisa, Tosca of Athens, USA] [Lisa, the Greek Tosca, UK]) (Sokrates Kapsaskis), 1959
Η Ζαβολιάρα / I Zaboliara, 1959
Erotikes Istories (Sokrates Kapsaskis) / Ερωτικές Ιστορίες, 1959
Moussitsa / Μουσίτσα, 1959
Ο θησαυρός του μακαρίτη / O thisavros tou makariti (Dead Man's Treasure), 1959
Xylo vyge apo ton paradeiso / Το Ξύλο βγήκε από τον Παράδεισο, 1959

1960s

Madalena / Μανταλένα, 1960
To Klotsoskoufi / Το Κλωτσοσκούφι, 1960
 Ηλέκτρα/Electra Michael Cacoyannis, 1961
Αγάπη και Θύελλα/Agapi kai Thiela (Sokrates Kapsaskis), 1961
Η Αλίκη στο Ναυτικό/I Aliki sto Naftiko (Alice in the Navy), Alekos Sakellarios, 1961
Χαμένα Όνειρα/Chamena Oneira, 1961
Η Λίζα και Η Άλλη/Liza kai I Alli, Dinos Dimopoulos, 1961
Ο Κατήφορος/O Katiphoros, 1961
Το Παιδί του μεθύστακα/To Paidi tou methistaka, 1961
Amartisa gia to Paidi (Αμάρτησα για το παιδί μου), 1962
Merikoi to Protimoun Kryo (Μερικοί το προτιμούν κρύο) = Many Choose Cold, 1962
Odo Oneiron (Οδό ονείρων) = Dream Street, 1962
Otan Leipei I Gata (Όταν λείπει η γάτα), 1962
Siralardaki heyecanlar, 1963
Chtipokardia sto thranio / Χτυποκάρδια στο θρανίο, 1963
 Δίψα για Ζωή /Dipsa gia Zoi = Thirst for Life (Sokrates Kapsaskis), 1963
Ένα Κορίτσι για δύο/Ena Koritsi Gia Dyo, 1963
Κάτι να καίει/Kati Na Kaiei = Something is Burning, 1963
Η Ψεύτρα/I Pseftra, Yannis Dalianidis, 1963
Αλίκη αγάπη μου/Aliki My Love, Rudolph Maté, 1963
Τα Κόκκινα Φανάρια/The Red Lanterns, Vassilis Georgiadis, 1963
Lola / Λόλα, 1964
Ζορμπάς ο Έλληνας/Zorba the Greek, Michael Cacoyannis, 1964 English language
Άπονη Ζωή/Aponi Zoi, 1964
Η Σωφερίνα/I Soferina. Alekos Sakellarios, 1964
O Polytechnos, 1964
Οι Αστεφάνωτοι/Oi Astefanoti, 1964
Το Δόλωμα/To Doloma, Alekos Sakellarios, 1964
Κορίτσια για φίλημα/Koritsia Gia Filima, 1964
O Megalos Orkos, 1965
Moderna stachtopouta / Μοντέρνα σταχτοπούτα, 1965
Afisea Me Na Zizo / Αφήστε με να ζήσω, 1965
Δύσκολοι Δρόμοι/Diskoloi Dromoi, 1965
Ο Νικητής/O Nikitis (The Victor), 1965
Oi Timoria, 1965
Περάστε Την Πρώτη Του Μηνός/Peraste tin proti tou minos, Sokrates Kapsaskis, 1965
Πικρή Ζωή / Pikri Zoi, Sokrates Kapsaskis, 1965
I kori mou i Sosialistria / Η κόρη μου η Σοσιαλίστρια  =  My daughter the Socialist, 1966
Αδικία/Adikia, 1966
Έχω δικαίωμα να σ' αγαπώ / Eho dikaioma na s'agapo (Apostolos Tegopoulos), 1966
Ζεστός μήνας Αύγουστος / Hot Month of August (Zestos minas Augoustos) (Sokrates Kapsaskis), 1966
Η Αρτίστα / i Artista (The Artist), 1966
Ματωμένη Γη / Matomeni Gi, 1967
Ο Προδότης / O Prodotis, 1967
Η Γόησσα / I Goissa, 1967
Η Ώρα της Δικαιoσύνης / Ora tis Dikaiosynis, 1967
Πάρε Κόσμε / Pare Kosme, 1967
Βίβα Ρένα / Viva Rena, 1967
Giga tis Kypselis, 1968
Ο Αλύγιστος / O Aligistos, 1968
I Theia Mou I Chipissa / Η θεία μου η χίπισσα, 1968
Mia Treli Sarantara / Μια τρελή σαραντάρα = One Crazy 40-year old, 1968
Ο Παλιάτσος / O Paliatsos, 1968
Ζηλιάρα / Ziliara, 1968
Z (Costa-Gavras), 1969
Αγωνία / Agonia, 1969
Ο Άνθρωπος της Καρπαζιάς / O Anthropos tis Karpazias, 1969
I Thissia Mias Ginekas / Η θυσία μιας γυναίκας = The sacrifice of a woman, 1969
Pariziana / Παριζιάνα, 1969
Το Τελευταίο Αντίο / To Teleftaio andeio, 1969

1970s

Reconstitution, 1970
Υπολοχαγός/Ipolochagos Natassa, 1970
Mia Ellinida Sto Charemi/Ελληνίδα στο χαρέμι, 1970
Ο Δοσίλογος/O Dosilogos, 1970
Ziteitai Epeigontos Gempros/Ζητείται επειγόντως γαμπρός, 1970
Ευδοκία/Evdokia, 1971
Η Κόρη του Ήλιου/Kori tou heliou, 1971
Η Αλίκη Δικτάτωρ/I Aliki dictator (Takis Vougiouklakis), 1972
The Countess of Corfu (Η κόμησσα της Κέρκυρας I Komissas tis Kerkyras), 1972
I Rena Einai Ofsaid/Offside (Η Ρένα είναι οφσάιντ) = Rena Is Offside, 1972
Maris tis Siopis / Μαρία  της σιωπής, 1973
O Tsarlatanos / Ο Τσαρλατάνος, 1973
Attila 74 (Michael Cacoyannis), 1974
Θίασος/The Travelling Players (Theo Angelopoulos), 1975
Fantarines/Φανταρίνες, 1979
Lysistrati '79/Λυσιστράτη '79 = Lysistrates '79, 1979

1980s

Rena Na I Efkairia/Ρένα να η ευκαιρία, 1980
Tis Politismas To Kagkelo/Της πολιτσμάνας το κάγκελο, 1981
I Manoulam To Manouli Ki O Paidaros/Η μανούλα, το μανούλι κι ο παίδαρος, 1982
I Sidira Kyria/Η σιδηρά κυρία, 1983
Rena Ta Resta Sou/Ρένα τα ρέστα σου = Rena Your Change, 1985
Τοπίο στην Ομίχλη/Landscape in the Mist Τοπίο στην ομίχλη (Theo Angelopoulos), 1988

1990s

Το βλέμμα  του/Ulysses' Gaze Οδυσσέα (Theo Angelopoulos), 1997
Μία Αιωνιότητα και μία Ημέρα/Eternity and a Day, 1998
Earth and Water, Panos Karkanevatos, 1999

2000s

The Attack of the Giant Mousaka, 2000
Safe Sex, 2000
 Risoto, Olga Malea, 2000
 Crying... Silicon Tears (To Klama Vgike Apo ton Paradeiso), Michalis Reppas - Thanassis Papathanasiou, 2001
 Dekapentaugoustos, Constantine Giannaris, 2002
Πολίτικη Κουζίνα/A Touch of Spice (Tassos Boulmetis), 2003
 Nyfes, Pantelis Voulgaris, 2004
 Hardcore, Denis Iliadis, 2004
 Loafing and Camouflage: Sirens in the Aegean (Loufa kai Paralagh: Seirines sto Agaio), Nikos Perakis, 2005
 Loukoumades me Meli, Olga Malea, 2005
 H Chorodia tou Charitona, Grigoris Karantinakis, 2005
 5 Lepta akoma, Giannis Xanthopoulos, 2006
 Omiros, Constantine Giannaris, 2005
 The Straight Story, Kostas Kapakas, 2006
 Mia Melissa ton Augousto, Thodoris Atheridis, 2007
 Alter Ego, Nikos Dimitropoulos, 2007
 El Greco, Yannis Smaragdis, 2007
 Gia Proti Fora Nonos, Olga Malea, 2007
 Molis Horisa, Vasilis Myrianthopoulos, 2007
 Afstiros katallilo, Michalis Reppas - Thanassis Papathanasiou, 2008
 The wedding party, Christine Crokos, 2008
 Dogtooth (Kynodontas), Yorgos Lanthimos, 2009
 Evil, in the time of heroes, Giorgos Nousias, 2009
 Pethainw gia sena Nikos Karapanayiotis, 2009
 Nisos, Christos Dimas, 2009
 S.E.X. Soula Ela Xana, Vasilis Myrianthopoulos, 2009
 Strella, Panos H. Koutras, 2009

2010s

 Attenberg, 2010 Athina Tsagari
45 squares / 45 τετράγωνα, 2010
I love Karditsa / I love Καρδίτσα, 2010
Wog Boy 2: Kings of Mykonos, 2010
Dangerous cooking / Επικίνδυνες μαγειρικές, 2010
The uprising of Red Mary / Η ανταρσία της Κόκκινης Μαρίας, 2010
Machairovgaltis, Μαχαιροβγάλτης, 2010 Yiannis Economides
Four black suits / Τέσσερα μαύρα κουστούμια, 2010
 Alps, 2011 Yorgos Lanthimos
 Christmas Tango, 2011
 The City of Children, 2011
 Debtocracy, 2011
 Unfair World, 2011 Fillipos Tsitos
 J.A.C.E., 2011 Menelaos Karamagiolis
 Man at Sea, 2011
 Magic Hour, 2011
 Paradise, 2011
 Red Sky, 2011
 Super Demetrios, 2011
 What if..., 2012
 Little England, 2013 Pantelis Voulgaris
 Miss Violence, 2013
 September, 2013
 The Eternal Return of Antonis Paraskevas, 2013
 To Mikro Psari, Yannis Economides, 2014
 The Lobster, Yorgos Lanthimos, 2015
 Worlds Apart, Christoforos Papakaliatis, 2015
Polyxeni (2017)

See also
 List of Cypriot films
 Cinema of Greece
 Cinema of Cyprus

External links
 Greek film at the IMDb

Greek-language films